Cassi Nicole Thomson (born 14 August 1993) is an Australian-born American actress and singer. She is known for her recurring role as Cara Lynn Walker in the television series Big Love and for her role as Nikki Papagus on the series Switched at Birth. She has also guest starred in several television series, such as Without a Trace, ER, House M.D., and CSI: Miami.

Life and career
Thomson was born in Queensland, Australia. She lived on a ranch in Vanuatu until she was 5 years old after which her family moved to New Haven, Missouri, in the United States. She currently lives in Los Angeles, California.

Thomson is an actress, appearing on film and television. She played recurring roles in the TV shows Big Love and Switched at Birth. She co-starred in the small-budget movie Cop Dog at age 15 in 2008. She starred in the 2014 reboot film Left Behind with Nicolas Cage and Chad Michael Murray. The film received mostly negative reviews from critics.

Thomson has also worked as a singer-songwriter. She completed her first music video in 2008, featuring her single "Caught Up in You", which co-stars Taylor Lautner.

Filmography

References

External links
 

1993 births
21st-century American actresses
Actresses from Los Angeles
American child actresses
American child singers
American film actresses
American women singer-songwriters
American singer-songwriters
American television actresses
Australian emigrants to the United States
Living people
People from Queensland
21st-century American singers
21st-century American women singers